San Joaquin Memorial High School is a private Roman Catholic high school in Fresno, California, United States. Founded in 1945, it is the only Catholic high school in the greater Fresno area. It is in the Roman Catholic Diocese of Fresno and has a current enrollment of about 620 students.

Athletics
San Joaquin Memorial High School is part of the County Metro League of the Central Section.

Notable alumni

Jim Costa, United States Congressman
Pete Dalena, professional baseball player and coach.
Henry S. Ensher, American Career Foreign Service Officer
Dana Ewell, convicted triple murderer.
Jalen Green, professional basketball player
Brook Lopez, professional basketball player
Robin Lopez, professional basketball player
Frank Ortenzio, professional baseball player
Cliff Pondexter, professional basketball player
Roscoe Pondexter, professional basketball player
Quincy Pondexter, professional basketball player
Mike Pronovost, Internet entrepreneur and founder and CEO of Powerband and Pronovost Technologies
Ruthie Quinto, CFO and Deputy Superintendent Fresno Unified School District
Phil Roman, animator of the Peanuts and Garfield animated specials
Jeff Schattinger, professional baseball player
Sybil Smith, All-American collegiate swimmer and mother of Sloane Stephens
Robert Upshaw, professional basketball player
Gary L. Wolfram,  William E. Simon Professor in Economics and Public Policy at Hillsdale College

References

External links
 http://www.sjmhs.org
 Private School Review

High schools in Fresno, California
Educational institutions established in 1945
Catholic secondary schools in California
1945 establishments in California